Marind may refer to:
Marind people
Marind languages
Marind language